was a Japanese actor associated with Ohta Production. He is best known for playing Tengensei Daigo/ShishiRanger in Gosei Sentai Dairanger.

Biography

Tatsuya Nōmi was born  in Tokyo on 13 August 1969, and he was a graduate of Akabane Commercial High School. In 1989, he joined the Tokyo Vaudeville Show, and his drama debut was in Dōkyūsei wa Shichihenge.

Robocon. His acting career also included the movie Izo and the taiga dramas Mōri Motonari and Tenchijin. On 30 September 2015, Nōmi announced that his contract with Ohta had expired.

Nōmi died in his home at the age of 47 on 18 May 2017. After the announcement, which was made to Sponichi Annex on 20 May by his elder brother , condolences were expressed both by fans on social media and by Super Sentai alumni, including Dairanger co-stars Keiichi Wada (Tenkasei Ryō/RyūRanger), Ei Hamura (Tenjūsei Shōji/TenmaRanger), Hisashi Sakai (Kōshinsei Kō/KibaRanger), Keisuke Tsuchiya (Kazu/KirinRanger), and also Michiko Makino (who played Hikaru Katsuragi/Pink Five in Choudenshi Bioman), Ryōsuke Kaizu and Kozo Kusakari (who played Red Mask and Black Mask respectively in Hikari Sentai Maskman), Kenta Satō (who played Red Turbo in Kosoku Sentai Turboranger) Kōhei Yamamoto and Nao Nagasawa (who played HurricaneYellow and HurricaneBlue respectively in Ninpuu Sentai Hurricaneger), and Tetsu Inada (who voiced Doggie Kruger in Tokusou Sentai Dekaranger) Liberty Times in Taiwan also covered the story.

On 2 September 2017, Dairanger co-stars initiated a party to celebrate Nōmi at Nakano Sun Plaza.

Filmography

1989
Dōkyūsei wa Shichihenge
1990
Roman Lenjitu (aired 22 March)
Soredemo Boku wa Haha ni Naritai (aired 18 July)
Yume Kigyō (episode 1)
1991
New Wave Drama: Oto Shizuka no Umi ni Nemure (aired 23 June)
Yo ni mo Kimyo na Monogatari: Channeling (aired 5 December)
1992
Otona wa wakattekurenai (episode 10)
Ohisashiburine!
1993-1994
Gosei Sentai Dairanger - Daigo / ShishiRanger
1994
Ari yo saraba (episode 4)
Furuhata Ninzaburō
Hagure Keiji Junjōha (aired 6 April)
Heart ni S: X'Mas Special
Kimi to ita Natsu (episodes 1 and 3)
Ōedofūunden
1995
Comedy Oedo de Gozaru
Heart ni S (episode 4, aired 1 May)
1997
Mōri Motonari
Nandemoya Tanteichō
Oishinbo (episode 4, aired 8 October)
1998
Meitantei Yuri Rintarō: Chōchō Satsujin Jiken (5 December 1998)
Naguru On'na (episode 7)
News no On'na (uncredited)
Souyakaikyō ni Kieta Satsujinsha (aired 19 December)
WITH LOVE (episode 1)
1999
Moero!! Robocon (episode 20)
Shōshimin Kēn (episode 11)
2000
All-Star Chūshingura Matsuri (aired 24 December)
Densetsu no Kyōshi (episode 7)
Shokatsu (episode 10)
2001
Kabushiki Otoko (aired 5 April)
Watashi o Ryokan ni Tsuretette (episode 2)
2002-2003
Ninpuu Sentai Hurricaneger (episodes 42 and 51) - Sanpei Hamada
2003
Bengoshi: Asahi Takenosuke (episode 19, aired 20 May)
Bijokayajū (episode 9)
Honō no Keibi Taichō: Igarashi Morio (aired 16 August)
Kansatsui Shinomiya Hazuki: Shitai wa Kataru (episode 3, aired 11 May)
Moshichi no Jikenbo: Fushigi Shōji (episode 4)
Natsuki Shizuko Suspense (aired 16 November)
Omiya-san (season 2, episode 4)
Tokumei Kakarichō Tadano Hitoshi (season 1, episode 4)
2004IZOMother & Lover (episodes 1, 2, and 4)Muta Keijikan Jiken File (episode 31, aired 10 April)Tsugunai (aired 30 June)
2005Keiyaku Kekkon (episode 47)Kensatsukan Kisogawa (aired 24 April)Magari Kado no Kanojo (episode 6)
2006AIBOU: Tokyo Detective Duo (season 4, episode 7)GoGo Sentai Boukenger (episode 37) - Wakabayashi ManagerOdoru! Oyabun Tantei (episode 2; aired 22 September)
2007
Yūkan Club (episode 3)
2008
Aiba Monogatari (aired 3 May)
Five (aired 5 January)
Je t'aime: Watashi wa kemono (episode 4)
Myū no Anyo Papa ni Ageru (aired 30 August)
Saitō-san (episode 6)
2009
Aishiteru: Kaiyō (episodes 1 and 2)
Gine: Sanfu Jinka no On'natachi (episode 3)
Tenchijin (episodes 33 and 34)
2010
Hanchō: Jinnanjo Azumihan (season 3, episode 12)
2011
Deka Wanko (episode 6)
Kansatsui: Shinomiya Hazuki: Shitai wa Kataru (aired 7 December) - Kudo Junichi
Shiritsu Tantei: Shimosawa Yui (aired 22 July)
Yo ni mo Kimyo na Monogatari: 2011-nen Aki no Kubetsuhen (aired 26 November)
2012
Answer: Keishichō Kenshō Sōsa-kan (episode 4)
Fukkō seyo! Gotō Shinpei to Taishin (aired 22 January)
2013
Gyakuten Hōdō no On'na (episode 2, aired 23 March)

References

External links
Official site (in Japanese)
IMDB page

1969 births
2017 deaths
Male actors from Tokyo
20th-century Japanese male actors
21st-century Japanese male actors
Japanese male film actors
Japanese male stage actors
Japanese male television actors